Ben Shabbethai (arabised as Ibn Shabbethai) is a Hebrew patronymic or patronymic surname literally meaning "son of Shabbethai. Notable people with the name include:

Judah ibn Shabbethai,  Jewish-Spanish poet of the end of the 12th century
Ḥayyim ben Shabbethai,Sephardic rabbi and Talmudist

Hebrew-language surnames
Patronymic surnames